Alexander Martin Freeman (1878 in Tooting, London – 18 December 1959) was a scholar of medieval Irish texts and collector of Irish music.

He collected traditional songs from older generation of singers in the West Cork Gaeltacht (Irish-speaking area) of Ballyvourney, Co. Cork during 1913/14, which became the Ballyvourney Collection.

His other works of scholarship are varied, and includes his edition of Annals of Connacht (1944), his magnum opus.

He was also on the  Publication Committee for the Irish Folk Song Society from 1920 until 1939, when the society was dissolved.

A lecture was given by Iarla Ó Lionáird on his Muskery Collection in Cork University on 30 January 2014.

Works

References

1878 births
1959 deaths
People from Tooting
English musicologists